Federal Highway 105 (Carretera Federal 105) is a Federal Highway of Mexico. The highway travels from Tempoal de Sánchez, Veracruz, in the north to Pachuca, Hidalgo, in the south.

References

105